Brahmaea ledereri is a species of moth of the family Brahmaeidae first described by Alois Friedrich Rogenhofer in 1873. It is found in Turkey.

The wingspan is 110–125 mm.

Subspecies
Brahmaea ledereri ledereri Rogenhofer, 1873
Brahmaea ledereri zaba de Freina, 1982 (eastern Turkey)

References

Brahmaeidae
Moths described in 1873
Insects of Turkey
Taxa named by Alois Friedrich Rogenhofer